Sachan is one of the territorial groups (sub castes) within the Kurmi caste in Uttar Pradesh, India.

Origin
"Sachan" term is said to be originated from marathi word "सचाणा" which means "Eagle".
They are said to be the infantry unit of Maratha army formed under Chhatrapati Shivaji Maharaj who were master in Gorrilla warfare. It is said that Sachans were masters in surprise attacks and gorilla tactics. 
During the period of Peshwas, they were sent to Kanpur (Ghatampur) as the representatives of Scindhia Royal House of Gwalior as Scindhias were entitled to manage Northern parts of Maratah Kingdom.
They participated in the Third Battle of Panipat and after the defeat of Marathas, they left warfare and started doing agriculture.
But during the 1857 Revolt of Kanpur, they played a major role in Tatya Tope's and Nana Saheb's army. Actually they were the among the major reasons why even after the end of 1857 revolt, the British daren't enter the Rural Kanpur region(present day Ghatampur and Bhognipur Tehsils) for next 1 year. 
They trace their origins from Maharashtra and consider themselves to belong to Bhosale Clan of Marathas who were sent to Kanpur for many reasons like  for administration, and after Third War of Panipat, all Sachans established themselves in the fertile lands of Kanpur. Also after Peshwa Bajirao II was sent to Bithoor as an exile, it is said that some of the Sachans came to Kanpur at that time.

Notable people of Sachan community 
 Nikhil Sachan
 Rakesh Sachan

See also 

 Awadhiya

References 

Castes
Social groups of Uttar Pradesh